Amilcare Beretta (born 15 March 1892, date of death unknown) was an Italian swimmer. He competed in two events at the 1908 Summer Olympics and the water polo tournament at the 1920 Summer Olympics.

References

External links
 

1892 births
Year of death missing
Italian male swimmers
Italian male water polo players
Olympic swimmers of Italy
Olympic water polo players of Italy
Swimmers at the 1908 Summer Olympics
Water polo players at the 1920 Summer Olympics
Swimmers from Milan